Grand Blue is an anime series adapted from the manga series, written by Kenji Inoue and illustrated by Kimitake Yoshioka. The anime series is written and directed by Shinji Takamatsu, with Takamatsu also handled the sound direction, Zero-G produced the animation and Hideoki Kusama designed the characters. It aired from July 14 to September 29, 2018, and it broadcast on the Animeism programming block on MBS, TBS, BS-TBS, and AT-X. The series was also streamed exclusively on Amazon Video worldwide. The opening theme song is "Grand Blue" performed by Shōnan no Kaze, while the ending theme song is  performed by Izu no Kaze (a group formed by Yūma Uchida, Ryohei Kimura, Hiroki Yasumoto, and Katsuyuki Konishi). The series ran for 12 episodes.


Episode List

Notes

References

Grand Blue